Philodamia is a genus of spiders in the family Thomisidae. It was first described in 1894 by Tamerlan Thorell. , it contains 7 species.

Species
Philodamia comprises the following species:
Philodamia armillata Thorell, 1895 – Bhutan, Myanmar
Philodamia gongi (Yin, Peng, Gong & Kim, 2004) – China
Philodamia hilaris Thorell, 1894 – Singapore
Philodamia pingxiang Zhu & Ono, 2007 – China
Philodamia semicincta (Workman, 1896) – Singapore
Philodamia tongmian Zhu & Ono, 2007 – China
Philodamia variata Thorell, 1894 – Singapore

References

Thomisidae
Thomisidae genera
Spiders of Asia
Taxa named by Tamerlan Thorell